Fringehead may refer to any of several members of the Neoclinus genus of fishes:

 Sarcastic fringehead, Neoclinus blanchardi
 Yellowfin fringehead, Neoclinus stephensae
 Onespot fringehead, Neoclinus uninotatus